Brunton House is a grade II* listed house in Brunton, Wiltshire, England. It dates from the late seventeenth or early eighteenth centuries and is of brick with flint panels and a tiled roof.

References 

Grade II* listed buildings in Wiltshire
Grade II* listed houses